Shah Latif Town is one of the neighbourhoods of Bin Qasim Town in Karachi, Sindh, Pakistan.

There are several ethnic groups in Bin Qasim Town including Urdu speakers, Sindhis, Punjabis, Kashmiris, Seraikis, Pakhtuns, Balochis, Brahuis, Memons, Bohras, Nagoris, Gujjars and Ismailis.

This is a large town side by side of National high way N-5 and near to Port Qasim Industrial Estate.

References

External links 
 Karachi Website.

Neighbourhoods of Karachi
Geography of Sindh